, literally "plate noodles" is a dish native to Nagasaki prefecture, Japan.

Consisting of a base of noodles, and a topping of fried cabbage, bean sprouts and other vegetables, as well as squid, prawns, pork, kamaboko etc.  There are two main varieties of noodles, thinner crispy noodles fried in oil (called pari pari, bari bari, or bari men); as a result this variation is reminiscent of Cantonese-style Chow Mein. Another variation uses thicker Chinese noodles (called chanpon noodles).

The style and thickness of noodles varies between restaurants.  Many restaurants outside Nagasaki prefecture serve only thin noodles which has led to the common misconception that the dish is only ever served with thin noodles.

If many people are eating together, it is customary for everyone to take their portion from a single large central dish.

There are food delivery services (demae) that specialise in sara udon for parties or offices that are working overtime.

Sara-udon is sometimes served in school meals at grade schools in Nagasaki prefecture.

See also
Chanpon
Chow mein
I fu mie
Nagasaki Chinatown
Ringer Hut

References

Soba
Udon
Mixed noodles